Nengren Temple is a Buddhist temple located on Mount Baiyun, in Baiyun District of Guangzhou, Guangdong, China.

History

Nengren temple was first established by Yinjian in 1824, during the reign of Daoguang Emperor (1821–1850) of the Qing dynasty (1644–1911). The buildings of Nengren Temple that still remain were being restored and preserved until in 1908, when the temple had reached unprecedented heyday and became the largest Buddhist temple on Mount Baiyun. 

On May 17, 1924, Sun Yat-sen and his wife Song Qingling visited Nengren Temple. 

In 1966, a Japanese youth delegation came to Nengren Temple to plant a group of Cinnamomum camphora named "China-Japan Youth Friendship Forest". 

In 1993, the Guangzhou Municipal Government has allocated  (US$ 2.383 million) for the reconstruction project. Then Nengren Temple was officially reopened to the public in May 1995.

Architecture
Nengren Temple is built along the up and down of mountains. Now the existing main buildings include the Paifang, Shanmen, Mahavira Hall, Ciyun Hall, Kṣitigarbha Hall, Sanmodi, Wuchendi, Sixth Patriarch Hall, Baoyue Pavilion, Guru Hall, Drum Tower, Bell Tower, Dining Hall, Reception Hall, etc.

References

Buddhist temples in Guangzhou
Buildings and structures in Guangzhou
Tourist attractions in Guangzhou
1824 establishments in China
19th-century Buddhist temples
Religious buildings and structures completed in 1824